Nomin talst (Монгол: Номин талст) was a Mongolian boy band. The group's name is a combination of the names "Nomin" and "Talst". In 2000, they released their album, Gerel suuder, featuring the title track "Gerel süüder". Nomin talst performed a final concert at the "UB Palace" in Ulaanbaatar on 27, 28 November 2007.

Members

D. Batsükh
{|border="0" cellspacing="0" cellpadding="0" align="left" style="background:transparent;"
|-
|-style="vertical-align:top"
| 

Sukhee (born Batsükh /Монгол: Д. Батсүх/, 17 October 1977, Ulaanbaatar) is a Mongolian pop star, and a member of Nomin talst. He is a tenor.

After success with Nomin talst, the band decided in 2007 to move on to solo projects. Batsükh was the first, with his debut solo album, Khotiin khugjim, released in May 2007. In 2008, his second album was released. 

In 2016, Batsükh was appointed as the Chief of Tourism for the city of Ulaanbaatar.

Amgalangyn Khayankhyarwaa

Khayanaa (born Amgalangyn Khayankhyarwaa /Монгол: Амгалангийн Хаянхярваа/, 20 August 1980, Ulaanbaatar) is a Mongolian pop star, and a member of Nomin talst. He is a tenor.

Khayanaa graduated from Ulaanbaatar's No.84 ten-year school in 1997. In 2000, he completed his Bachelor of Business Administration degree at the Institute of Finance and Economics.

In 2006, Khayanaa released a solo album titled Ankhnii zakhidal. He is currently studying for a Master's of Business Administration degree at the Academy of Management.

T. Delgermörön

Deegii (born T. Delgermörön /Монгол: Т. Дэлгэрмөрөн/, 27 November 1979, Ulaanbaatar) is a Mongolian pop star, and a member of Nomin talst. He is a tenor.

He graduated from Ulaanbaatar's No.84 ten-year school in 1997. 

He attempted a career as a solo artist in 2005, when he released Amin zurkh, his second solo album, in 2007. His third album Bi Mongol khun was released in 2010.

T. Khan-gerel

Khaazaa (born T. Khan-gerel /Монгол: Т. Хан-гэрэл/, 17 April 1979, Ulaanbaatar) is a Mongolian pop star, and a member of Nomin talst. He is a baritone.

He graduated from Ulaanbaatar's No.5 ten-year school in 1997. In 2003, he completed his law school of General Intelligence Agency.

Discography

 Gerel süüder /Гэрэл сүүдэр/ (2000)
 Eejdee /Ээждээ/ (2001)
 Tatakh khüch /Татах хүч/ (2002)
 Nemekh khasakh tseneg /Нэмэх хасах цэнэг/ (2003)
 Bidnii üye /Бидний үе/ (2005)
 Best of Nomin talst /Шилдгүүдээс шилэв/ (2006)
2014 (2014)

Solo careers

T. Delgermurun
 Amin zürkh /Амин зүрх/ (2005)
 Nadad itge /Надад итгэ/ (2007)
 Bi Mongol khün /Би Монгол хүн/ (2010)

A. Khayankhyarwaa
 Ankhnii zakhidal /Анхны захидал/ (2007)

D. Batsükh
 Khotiin khügjim /Хотын хөгжим/ (2007)
 Ergen dursakh ayalguu /Эргэн дурсах аялгуу/ (2008)

Awards
Pentatonic awards
 1998, Best debut band
 2000, Best album
 1998, Best band
 1998, Best song

Golden microphone awards
 2000, Best work

UBS Music Video Awards

References

 
 
 
 
 

Mongolian musical groups
Musical groups established in 1997
1997 establishments in Mongolia